New Radnor railway station was a station in New Radnor, Powys, Wales. The terminus station opened in 1875 and closed in 1951.

The Kington and Eardisley Railway developed an extension to the Leominster and Kington Railway from Kington, with ambitions to extend a cross-Wales railway line to Aberystwyth. Developing a small station  from the town, the plans never came to fruition, only allowing services on the Great Western Railway to both Leominster and onwards to London Paddington. The station closed to passengers in February 1951, and freight in December 1951.

References

Further reading

Disused railway stations in Powys
Railway stations in Great Britain opened in 1875
Railway stations in Great Britain closed in 1951
Former Great Western Railway stations